Mount Bishop may refer to:
 Mount Bishop (Elk Range) on the Continental Divide and the boundary between the provinces of British Columbia and Alberta, Canada
 Mount Bishop (Fannin Range) in the North Shore Mountains of British Columbia, Canada
 Mount Bishop (Camelsfoot Range), a mountain near Lillooet, British Columbia, Canada
 Mount Bishop (Antarctica) in Antarctica

See also
Bishop Peak (disambiguation)